Barnitz may refer to:

Places
Barnitz, Germany, a municipality in Schleswig-Holstein, Germany
Barnitz (river), a river in Schleswig-Holstein, Germany
Barnitz, Pennsylvania, a place in Cumberland County, Pennsylvania, USA (see list of places in Pennsylvania: B)

People
Charles Augustus Barnitz (1780–1850), member of the U.S. House of Representatives from Pennsylvania
David Park Barnitz (1878–1901), American poet
Frank Barnitz (born 1968), Missouri farmer and former Democratic member of the Missouri State Senate
Richard Bronaugh Barnitz (1891–1960), lieutenant colonel in the US Army and the manager of the Los Angeles Airport